The Herero chat (Namibornis herero) is a species of bird in the family Muscicapidae. It is monotypic within the genus Namibornis. It is endemic to the Namibian savanna woodlands.

References

 Del Hoyo, J.; Elliot, A. & Christie D. (editors). (2006). Handbook of the Birds of the World. Volume 11: Old World Flycatchers to Old World Warblers. Lynx Edicions. .

Herero chat
Birds of Southern Africa
Fauna of Namibia
Herero chat
Herero chat
Taxonomy articles created by Polbot
Taxobox binomials not recognized by IUCN